Citizens and Southern National Bank of South Carolina is a building on 50 Broad St., Charleston, South Carolina. It was named to the National Register of Historic Places in 1971.

References

Bank buildings on the National Register of Historic Places in South Carolina
Commercial buildings completed in 1835
Buildings and structures in Charleston, South Carolina
National Register of Historic Places in Charleston, South Carolina